Ponometia venustula is a species of bird dropping moth in the family Noctuidae first described by Francis Walker in 1865.

The MONA or Hodges number for Ponometia venustula is 9087.

References

Further reading

External links
 

Acontiinae
Articles created by Qbugbot
Moths described in 1865